Shannon Jay McDonnell (born 5 August 1987) is a former Ireland international rugby league footballer who last played for St Helens in the Super League. He had previously played for National Rugby League clubs the Wests Tigers and the Newcastle Knights, and in the Super League for Hull Kingston Rovers and Hull FC.

Background
McDonnell was born in Camden, New South Wales, Australia. McDonnell is of Irish descent and attended Mount Carmel High School and Westfields Sports High School, while playing his junior football for All Saints Liverpool. He was then signed by the Wests Tigers. He is the son of Wests Tigers Recruitment Manager Warren McDonnell.

Playing career

Early career
In 2004, McDonnell played for the New South Wales Under-17s team. The next season, he played for the New South Wales Under-19s team and made his NRL début for the Wests Tigers against the Penrith Panthers in Round 26 of the 2005 NRL season.

Wests Tigers
Having played one game for Tigers in 2005, McDonnell was named as the probable replacement for winger Pat Richards, if he was unable to overcome an ankle injury, to take his place in the 2005 NRL Grand Final team.

In 2008, McDonnell made himself available for Ireland's 2008 Rugby League World Cup campaign. Although named in the Ireland training squad for the World Cup, he was forced to withdraw through injury.

Newcastle Knights
On 7 May 2009, McDonnell joined the Newcastle Knights mid-season for the remainder of the year, after being released from his Tigers contract.

At the conclusion of the 2011 NRL season, McDonnell joined Hull KR in the English Super League.

Hull Kingston Rovers
At the beginning of 2012, McDonnell joined the Hull Kingston Rovers in the Super League on a 1-year contract, following his former Knights assistant coach Craig Sandercock.

In June 2012, McDonnell played for the Exiles.

Hull F.C.
On 26 October 2012, McDonnell signed a 2-year contract with Hull KR's cross city rival team in Hull FC, starting in 2013. In his first year at the club, he helped the team to the 2013 Challenge Cup Final against the Wigan Warriors where they were defeated 16–0.

St Helens
On 3 July 2014, McDonnell joined St Helens mid-season for the remainder of the year, after resigning from his Hull F.C. contract.

In October and November 2014, McDonnell played for Ireland in the 2014 European Cup. He scored two tries on début as Ireland beat France 22–12 in their European Cup opener.

On 5 January 2015, McDonnell signed a train and trial contract to return to his first club Wests Tigers, in the hope of impressing for a second-tier contract.

On 30 April 2015, McDonnell rejoined St Helens effective immediately on a 2-year contract.

In 2016, he was called up to the Ireland squad for the 2017 Rugby League World Cup European Pool B qualifiers.

Camden Rams
McDonnell played for the Camden Rams in 2017.

In October 2017, Shannon was called up to the Ireland squad for the 2017 Rugby League World Cup.

References

External links

Statistics at rugbyleagueproject.org
(archived by web.archive.org) Newcastle Knights profile
NRL.com profile
2017 RLWC profile
Saints Heritage Society profile

1987 births
Living people
Australian people of Irish descent
Australian expatriate sportspeople in England
Australian rugby league players
Central Coast Centurions players
Exiles rugby league team players
Hull F.C. players
Hull Kingston Rovers players
Ireland national rugby league team players
Newcastle Knights players
Rugby league fullbacks
Rugby league players from Sydney
Rugby league wingers
St Helens R.F.C. players
Wests Tigers NSW Cup players
Wests Tigers players